The Antonio Puerta Trophy is an annual summer tournament hosted by Sevilla FC since 2008. The tournament is dedicated to Antonio Puerta, who died on August 28, 2007 (at the age of 22) after suffering a heart injury during the inaugural match of the 2007-08 La Liga season against Getafe.

Editions

2008 
Played on 23 August 2008 against Málaga CF, the team promoted to La Liga that year. It served for remember Antonio Puerta and all the victims of the Spanair Flight 5022, the aerean accident occurred three days before.

2009 
Played on 21 August 2009 against Xerez, team also promoted to Liga BBVA that year as occurred in 2008 with Málaga.

2010 
It was played on November, during a Liga BBVA break because of UEFA Champions League Group Stage (matchday 5). The rival this time was Granada, team promoted that season to Liga Adelante. It has been the first time since this tournament exists that Sevilla lost the final match.

2011 
The fourth edition of the tournament was celebrated in summer again, during the pre-season. The guest for the first time wasn't Andalusian; it was RCD Espanyol, Sevilla twinned team after suffering a similar tragedy as happened to the organizing club in 2007 (Daniel Jarque's death).

2012 
Played on 8 August 2012 due to the early start of 2012–13 La Liga, against Deportivo La Coruña, a traditional Sevilla "friend" team.

2013

2014

2016

2017

2019

2022

Titles by team

Goalscorers

References 

Spanish football friendly trophies
Sevilla FC
2008 establishments in Spain